The Algerians of the Pacific were a group of men native of Algeria  deported by French authorities to labor camps on the island of New Caledonia, after taking part in the 1870–1871 uprising against colonial rule in Algeria.

Their arrest took place in 1871, and 212 persons were tried together in 1873, in the city of Constantine. Most were sent over to prisons in metropolitan France – Oléron and Saint-Martin-de-Ré (on Île de Ré) – then, as these were due to be closed, to Quélern (near Brest). At the same time, 29 of them were kept in Oran; Antoine Chanzy, the Governor-General, attempted to have them removed from the public's eye by proposing they should be sent to the Marquesas Islands. They too were ultimately transported to Quélern, through Marseille. A third group was imprisoned together with former Communards in Thouars.

Due to malfunctions in the communication between ministries, the distinction made between sentences to transportation (traditionally, to French Guiana) and deportation (to New Caledonia) was no longer made – all were sent to New Caledonia in the end.

Their arrival on the island coincided with transports of Communards, who were to leave precious testimonies of the Kabyles' presence. However, the Kabyles were left behind when the Communards were granted an amnesty in 1879, and remained in exile despite campaigns to raise sympathy among the French public. An amnesty was awarded only in 1895, and they were not able to return to Algeria until after 1904.

Some descendants of the deported still live in New Caledonia. One of them, Taïeb Aïfa, served as the mayor of Bourail from 1977 to 2001. In , south of Bourail, there is a Cimetière des Arabes, or "Cemetery of the Arabs"; over time, the community began to identify as "Arabs" rather than with a Kabyle or local designation. One elderly Algerian-Caledonian traces this to an occasion when the Algerians arrived to perform labour during Ramadan dressed in white robes, whereupon the native Caledonians decided that they must be "Arabs".

Notable deportees
 Cheikh Boumerdassi

See also
 French ship Loire (1827)

References
Mehdi Lallaoui, Kabyles du Pacifique, 1994, Éditions Au nom de la mémoire.
http://www.iisg.nl/collections/new-caledonia/: article and list of names of the deported (2011)

19th century in Africa
Pacific
Arab diaspora in Oceania
Berber diaspora
Deportation
Ethnic groups in New Caledonia
French Third Republic
History of New Caledonia
Pacific
Law enforcement in France
 
19th century in Oceania
19th century in New Caledonia
1873 in Algeria
1873 in Oceania